Sander Gillé and Joran Vliegen were the defending champions but lost in the first round to Sander Arends and David Pel.

Jonny O'Mara and Ken Skupski won the title after defeating Arends and Pel 6–1, 6–4 in the final.

Seeds

Draw

References

External links
 Main draw

Internationaux de Tennis de Vendee - Doubles
2019 Doubles